Communications data (sometimes referred to as traffic data or metadata) concerns information about communication.

Communications data is a part of a message that should be distinguished from the content of the message. It contains data on the communication's origin, destination, route, time, date, size, duration, or type of underlying service.

References

See also 
 Call detail record
 Internet Protocol Detail Record
 Pen Register
 Data Retention Directive
 Interception Modernization Programme
 Mastering the Internet
 NSA Call Database
 CSE and Communications data
 Titan traffic database

Law enforcement equipment
Surveillance
Privacy of telecommunications